The first season of the American dramedy television series Ugly Betty began airing on September 28, 2006 and concluded on May 17, 2007.

In addition to the twenty-three regular episodes in season one, a special, "The Beautiful World of Ugly Betty", was aired on April 12, 2007. Another special, which was a half-hour update recapping the first ten episodes, aired during the month of January 2007 on local ABC affiliates and various cable networks.

Being produced in Los Angeles, the success of the season would lead to the production of the show's second season.

Cast
For the first season of Ugly Betty, nine characters were initially included in the main cast. Michael Urie and Kevin Sussman were originally credited as Special Guest Stars but were upgraded to regulars mid-season. However, Kevin Sussman's character was written off the show in the fifteenth episode but was still credited as a regular for the rest of the season. Rebecca Romijn's character was introduced in the middle of the season and was immediately credited as Starring.

Regular cast
 America Ferrera as Betty Suarez
 Eric Mabius as Daniel Meade
 Alan Dale as Bradford Meade
 Tony Plana as Ignacio Suarez
 Ana Ortiz as Hilda Suarez
 Ashley Jensen as Christina McKinney
 Becki Newton as Amanda Tanen
 Mark Indelicato as Justin Suarez
 Vanessa L. Williams as Wilhelmina Slater
 Michael Urie as Marc St. James
 Kevin Sussman as Walter
 Rebecca Romijn as Alexis Meade

Guest cast
 Christopher Gorham as Henry Grubstick
 Judith Light as Claire Meade
 Stelio Savante as Steve
 Ava Gaudet as Gina Gambarro
 Salma Hayek as Sofia Reyes
 Kevin Alejandro as Santos
 Jowharah Jones as Nico Slater
 Octavia Spencer as Constance Grady
 Gina Gershon as Fabia
 Jayma Mays as Charlie
 Bailey Chase as Beckett 'Becks' Scott
 Max Greenfield as Nick Pepper
 Liz Torres as Evelyn
 Lucy Liu as Grace Chin
 Angélica Vale as Angelica

Episodes

<onlyinclude>
Notes:
"Swag" was originally scheduled to be aired as the 4th episode, but was moved to 11th by the network. The change resulted in a number of continuity problems, which were "fixed" by making most of the episode a flashback and adding scenes with Betty telling Christina the bulk of the story. In Italy, Denmark, Spain, India and the Philippines, the episode is retained as the 4th episode.
On the season 1 DVD box set, "Swag" is listed as episode 4, without the scenes of Betty talking to Christina in a flashback. Other noticeable changes on the DVD were the reversed order of the show's episode chronology: "The Box and the Bunny", which is the second episode, is listed as the third episode, having swapped places with "Queens for a Day". However, "The Box and the Bunny" should be the second episode.</onlyinclude>

Ratings

United States
In the following summary, "Rating" is the estimated percentage of all televisions tuned to the show, and "Share" is the percentage of all televisions in use that are tuned in, "viewers" is the estimated number of actual people watching, in millions, while "ranking" is the approximate ranking of the show against all prime-time TV shows for the week (Sunday to Saturday).

United Kingdom
Ugly Betty was aired on Channel 4 on a usual time of Fridays at 9.00pm.

DVD release

The 23 episodes, along with bonus footage and unaired extras, are featured in "Ugly Betty: The Complete First Season — The Bettyfied Edition", which is distributed internationally by Buena Vista Home Entertainment. According to TV Shows on DVD, BVHE released the six-disc set on August 21, 2007 and is available in regions 1 (United States and Canada), 2 (European territories) and 4 (Asia and Australia). The features include a look at the show's best and worst fashions, a Spanish audio track, a discussion with the cast on the show's origins, and a behind-the-scenes documentary with commentary from the production, set, and costume designers on the program. The discs are presented in Dolby Digital 5.1 Surround Sound and have a total running time of 992 minutes/946 minutes R4.

Among the features:
 "Becoming Ugly"
 America Ferrera and the cast discuss what it means to get Bettyfied
 "A La MODE"
 Behind-the-scenes with production, set and costume designers to discover how the world of MODE was created
 "Green is the New Black"
 See the high fashion of Manhattan and coziness of Queens all created on a Hollywood sound stage
 Deleted scenes
 Audio commentaries
 Bloopers

Soundtrack
Despite never having a physical or digital release a soundtrack of the series. This music was used during the first season of the series.

 Suddenly I See by KT Tunstall
 I Like It A Lot by Princess Superstar
 She Works Hard for the Money by Donna Summer
 Wanna Fly by Vassy
 In The Car Crash by Swayzak
 Love Me or Hate Me by Lady Sovereign
 Buttons by Pussycat Dolls
 Hips Don't Lie by Shakira
 La Cubanita by Los Ninos De Sara
 Keep Ya Body Movin' by Dance Dance Revolution
 Can I Get Get Get by Junior Senior
 Beauty and the Beast by Angela Lansbury
 Right Back Where We Started From by Maxine Nightingale
 Machine Gun by The Commodores
 Latin Lover by Lemon
 Season of the Witch by Luna
 Bad Girls by Donna Summuer
 The Glamorous Life by Sheila E
 A Marshmallow World by Dean Martin
 Santa Claus Is Comin' to Town by The Chipmunks
 Mambo Santa Mambo by The Enchanters
 Dance of the Sugar Plum Fairy (Red Baron Remix) by Berlin Symphony Orchestra
 Love Theme by Jeff Beal
 Broken heart by Jeff Beal
 Bebot by Black Eyed Peas
 We Share Our Mother's Health by The Knife
 9 to 5 by Lady Sovereign
 The Weekend by Michael Gray
 I Got You Babe by Sonny and Cher
 Lovely 2 C U by Goldfrapp
 Because I'm Awesome by The Dollyrots
 Fame by David Bowie
 Shake by Mainline
 Ooh by Scissor Sisters
 I Know What Boys Like by The Waitresses
 Kiss And Say Goodbye by Steve Brookstein
 Tomorrow by Aileen Quinn
 What Goes Around...Comes Around by Justin Timberlake
 Super Freak by Rick James
 You Give Me Something by James Morrison
 Do Right Man by Aretha Franklin
 Turn to Real Life by Shiny Toy Guns
 Boys Wanna Be Her by Peaches
 Orange Sky by Alexi Murdoch
 Chariots of Fire by Vangelis
 I Am Ready by Counting Crows
 Colorblind by Counting Crows
 Grace Kelly by Mika
 Here I Come by Fergie
 Hot Like Wow by Space Cowboy Feat. Nadia Oh
 Running Away by Space Cowboy Feat. Nadia Oh
 Glamorous (Space Cowboy Remix) by Fergie
 We Luv You by Unkle Jam
 Mas Que Nada by Sergio Mendes feat. The Black Eyed Peas
 Departure by William Bradford Mersereau Jr.
 Eye of the Tiger by Survivor
 This is Not a Test by Oppenheimer
 We Will Rock You by Queen
 Sonido Total by Pinker Tones
 La Gallina by Ozomatli
 The Way We Were by Dave Koz feat. Vanessa L. Williams

References

Ugly Betty
2006 American television seasons
2007 American television seasons